George Bickley may refer to:

George Harvey Bickley (1868–1924), American bishop of the Methodist Episcopal Church
George W. L. Bickley (1823–1867), founder of the Knights of the Golden Circle